This is a list of mountain peaks ordered by their topographic prominence.

Terminology
The prominence of a peak is the minimum height of climb to the summit on any route from a higher peak, or from sea level if there is no higher peak. The lowest point on that route is the col.

For full definitions and explanations of topographic prominence, key col, and parent, see topographic prominence. In particular, the different definitions of the parent of a peak are addressed at length in that article. Height on the other hand simply means elevation of the summit above sea level.

Regarding parents, the prominence parent of peak A can be found by dividing the island or region in question into territories, by tracing the runoff from the key col (mountain pass) of every peak that is more prominent than peak A. The parent is the peak whose territory peak A resides in.

The encirclement parent is found by tracing the contour below peak A's key col and picking the highest mountain in that region. This is easier to determine than the prominence parent; however, it tends to give non-intuitive results for peaks with very low cols such as Jabal Shams which is #110 in the list.

Note that either sort of parent of a typical very high-prominence peak such as Denali will lie far away from the peak itself, reflecting the independence of the peak.

Most sources (and the table below) define no parent for island and landmass highpoints; others treat Mount Everest as the parent of every such peak with the ocean as the "key col".

Prominence table 

The following table lists the Earth's 125 most topographically prominent summits. Of these, China has the most: 16. Close behind it are Indonesia, with 13, and the United States with 12.

Additional peaks
The list of peaks that follows is not complete, but the peaks are all notable. Note that island high points (whose prominence is equal to their elevation) can be found at the List of islands by highest point; hence most are not included below. Some well-known peaks listed here do not score highly by prominence.

All peaks with a prominence of more than 1,500 metres rank as an Ultra. For a complete listing of all 1,524 peaks with prominence greater than this level, see the lists of Ultras.

In the table, the prominence parent is marked "1", and the encirclement parent "2". Where a single parent is listed, the different definitions agree.

See also
Lists of Ultras
List of mountain lists
List of islands by highest point
Summit
Topographic elevation
Topographic isolation
Topographic prominence
Ultra-prominent summit

Notes
*.By convention, cols created by human activity are not counted. Therefore, the Suez, Panama and other canals are ignored in these calculations. Cuts that lower the natural elevations of mountain passes are also ignored. Towers, monuments and similar on the peaks are also ignored.

References

External links
World peaks with 4000 meters of prominence from peakbagger.com
World top 50 most prominent peaks, originally compiled by David Metzler and Eberhard Jurgalski, and updated with the help of others as new elevation information, especially SRTM, has become available.
World top 100 most prominent peaks, from the same authors as the top 50.
Map of the top 50 by Ken Jones
Lists and/or maps covering all peaks in the world with 1500 m+ prominence. Compiled by Aaron Maizlish. The latest estimate is that there are 1,516.

 
Peaks, Prominence